The 1956 Wrestling World Cup was held on May 25–31 in Istanbul, Turkey, at the Mithatpaşa Stadium, under the auspices of FILA. The attendance of the event was around 20 thousand spectators at the stadium. Freestyle wrestling competition was held from May 25 to May 27, 61 wrestlers from 12 countries participated in the freestyle event. Greco-Roman wrestling competition was held from May 29 to May 31, 89 wrestlers from 16 countries participated in the Greco-Roman event. The team victory in the freestyle event was won by the Turkish National Team, which scored 44 points out of 48 possible, followed by the USSR National Team. The team victory in the Greco-Roman event was won by the USSR team, which scored 39 points. The overall team victory was won by the Soviet Union, therefore the USSR National Team won the World Cup.

Participating teams
The competition was attended by teams of the following states and independent territories: Austria, Belgium, Bulgaria, Egypt, Finland, France, West Germany, Hungary, Iran, Italy, Japan, Lebanon, Netherlands, Pakistan, Poland, Romania, Saarland, Soviet Union, Switzerland, Syria, Turkey, United Arab Emirates, United Kingdom, Yemen, Yugoslavia. The United States didn't have a team in competition.

Medal summary

Men's freestyle

Men's Greco-Roman

Outstanding Wrestler of the tournament 
 Alimbeg Bestayev (Soviet Union)

References

Sources

News

External links
 Rare Postcard: 25-31 May 1956 Istanbul World Cup Wrestling Championships

1950s in Istanbul
1956 in sport wrestling
Wrestling World Cup
1956 in Turkish sport
May 1956 sports events in Europe
International wrestling competitions hosted by Turkey
Sports competitions in Istanbul